Mesosa indica is a species of beetle in the family Cerambycidae. It was described by Stephan von Breuning in 1935. It is known from Sri Lanka, India, Vietnam, and Myanmar.

References

indica
Beetles described in 1935